Forsythia europaea, commonly known as Albanian forsythia or European forsythia, is a species of flowering plant in the olive family, with a native range from Montenegro to northern Albania. It is the only species of Forsythia native to Europe; prior to its discovery in Albania in 1897, it was thought that all Forsythia were native to East Asia.

Description 

Phylogeny 

The closest relative of F. europaea is F. giraldiana, a species of Forsythia native to China.

Cultivation 
F. europaea was first cultivated in 1899, at Kew Gardens in London, United Kingdom. It is not as widely cultivated as other species of Forsythia as it is not as ornamental, although it is still occasionally grown in parks and gardens.

Cultivars produced by hybridisation of F. europaea with F. ovata, a more ornamental species of Forsythia native to Korea, include:

 Forsythia 'Meadowlark', which was developed at North Dakota State University. Its leaves are ivy-green.
 Forsythia 'Northern Sun', which was developed at the University of Minnesota.

References 

Forsythieae
Flora of Albania
Flora of Montenegro
Plants described in 1898